The pre-season of the 2019–20 NBL season, the 42nd season of Australia's National Basketball League, started on 19 June and ended on 16 October 2019.

The pre-season featured games in China, the Philippines and the United States, and featured the NBLxNBA 2019 Tour in which five NBL teams played a total of seven games.

Games

2019 NBL China Tour 

China won the series 2–1.

Adelaide 36ers pre-season

Brisbane Bullets pre-season

Cairns Taipans pre-season

Illawarra Hawks pre-season

Melbourne United pre-season

Perth Wildcats pre-season

South East Melbourne Phoenix pre-season

Sydney Kings pre-season

2019 NBL Blitz Tasmania 

The NBL Blitz is an annual pre-season tournament featuring all nine NBL teams and a new NBL1 All Stars team from the NBL1 semi professional basketball league. This season all games were held in Tasmania from the 19th to 22 September 2019 in Hobart, Ulverstone, Launceston and Devonport. Derwent Entertainment Centre hosted the Three-Point Shootout and Dunk Contest on the 22nd. The Brisbane Bullets won the tournament and received the seventh annual Loggins-Bruton Cup.

Day 1 Ulverstone

Day 2 Kingborough & Devonport

Day 3 Launceston

Day 4 Hobart

The Brisbane Bullets won the 2019 NBL Blitz championship.

NBLxNBA 2019 Tour

Pre-season ladder

NBL Blitz ladder

References

Pre-season